The 1978–79 English League North season was the first season of the English League North (also known as the Midland League), the top level ice hockey league in northern England. Five teams participated in the league with the Sheffield Lancers winning the first year's championship.

Regular season

External links
 Season on hockeyarchives.info

English
English League North seasons